The PWG World Championship is a professional wrestling world championship in the Pro Wrestling Guerrilla (PWG) professional wrestling promotion. It was first introduced in 2003 as the PWG Championship. The inaugural champion was Frankie Kazarian. The current champion is Daniel Garcia, who is in his first reign.

History 
The title became known under its current name in February 2006, when PWG had a two-event European Vacation tour stopping in Essen, Germany and Orpington, England. The title has also been defended in Japan in the Dragon Gate promotion, as well as in the United Kingdom in 1PW and again on PWG's European Vacation II tour in Paris, France, Portsmouth, England and Essen, Germany. The title was later defended by Chris Hero in Queensland, Australia on two occasions.

Reigns 

Overall, there have been 32 reigns among 25 different wrestlers. The inaugural champion was Frankie Kazarian, who won the championship by defeating Joey Ryan in the finals of a sixteen man tournament on August 30, 2003, at PWG's Bad Ass Mother 3000 – Stage 2 event. At 863 days, Bandido's only reign is the longest in the title's history. Bryan Danielson is the shortest reigning champion in history by vacating it immediately after winning it for the second time. Kevin Steen holds the record for most reigns, with 3.

Daniel Garcia is the current champion in his first reign. He defeated Bandido on the May 5, 2022 at Delivering The Goods in Los Angeles, CA.

References

External links 
  PWG World Title History at Cagematch.net

Pro Wrestling Guerrilla championships
World professional wrestling championships